Mariusz Fyrstenberg and Marcin Matkowski won the tournament. They defeated Olivier Charroin and Stéphane Robert in the final, 7–5, 7–6(7–4).

Seeds

Draw

Draw

References
 Doubles Draw

BNP Paribas Polish Open - Doubles